Per Meinich (16 June 1931 – 17 July 2009) was a  Norwegian economist.

He was born in Nøtterøy. He took his cand.oecon. degree in 1955 and the dr.philos. degree in 1969 on the thesis A Monetary General Equilibrium Theory for an International Economy. He worked for the Norwegian Savings Banks Association from 1958 to 1960. He was a docent at the University of Oslo from 1966 to 1972 and as a professor from 1972 to his retirement. He was a member of the Norwegian Academy of Science and Letters. He died in July 2009.

References

1931 births
2009 deaths
People from Nøtterøy
Norwegian economists
Academic staff of the University of Oslo
Members of the Norwegian Academy of Science and Letters